Jefferson de Carvalho Santos (born August 30, 1995) is a Brazilian athlete, a combined events specialist. A native of São Paulo, he won the men's decathlon competition at the 2017 South American Championships in Athletics with a personal best score of 8,187 points; due to strong winds in three of the ten events, the result  is labelled wind assisted in official records.

References

External links

1995 births
Living people
Brazilian decathletes
World Athletics Championships athletes for Brazil
Athletes (track and field) at the 2019 Pan American Games
Pan American Games athletes for Brazil
Athletes from São Paulo
21st-century Brazilian people